John Laverty (born 6 July 1982) is a Northern Irish former motorcycle racer from Toomebridge, Northern Ireland. He was champion of the Cup class of the British Superbike Championship in 2008. His older brother Michael and younger brother Eugene are both also notable racers.

Personal life
In his youth he was a keen tennis player. His sporting heroes are George Best and John McEnroe He also enjoys Trials Riding and Golf

Early career
Laverty raced motocross in his youth, switching to circuit racing for the 1999 Aprillia Challenge UK. The early part of his career was affected by injuries, however he scored a single European Superstock podium at Imola in 2003 and finished 7th overall in 2004. He first entered the British Superbike Championship in 2005, but pulled out when the bike proved uncompetitive. He spent the next 2½ years in British Superstock, taking over a ride midseason (and ultimately earning long-term backing from the team's sponsor Buildbase). He came close to a first win at Donington 2005 and Oulton Park 2006, and it finally came at Brands Hatch in 2007. he was 5th overall in the series in 2006 and 4th overall in 2007.

British Superstock/Superbike Cup
For 2008 Laverty was entered by the Northwest 200 Ducati team into the British Superstock Championship, which allows few modifications to basic road bikes. Three days before the season started, the team discovered that the bike was ineligible. They instead entered him into the British Superbike Cup, as a team-mate to the veteran Michael Rutter. Laverty qualified 9th overall for the season opener, and lead the Cup class throughout, winning it comfortably in the end, taking 11 class wins and 9 further podiums despite missing the Knockhill round due to injury. 
He finished 17th overall, with a best overall result of 8th, although fellow Cup entrant Gary Mason outpointed him in the main class due to a strong finish He finished 2008 by contesting the Kings of Wanneroo meeting in Perth, Australia, which for 2008 was run to Superstock regulations

British Superbike Championship
For 2009 he switched to the Hawk Kawasaki team, taking Buildbase as title sponsor. After a slow start to the season in the first event, at Oulton Park Laverty narrowly escaped serious injury after he went on the grass to overtake and subsequently fell casing a red flag, he was unable to make race 2 due to a concussion. Laverty earned his best finish of the year at Mallory Park finishing 4th in race 2

2010
Laverty remained with Buildbase for 2010, scoring his first podium finish at Oulton Park.  The rest of the year saw mid-pack finishes, ending the season in 8th place with 190 points

2011
The 2011 season saw John ride again for Buildbase but this time astride the BMW S1000RR.  The season did not start well as technical issues prevailed.  But as the season continued the team worked hard to resolve these issues
At the second visit to Oulton Park mid season towards the end of Free Practice 1 John suffered a serious crash on the start-finish straight leaving him with serious injuries.  This unfortunately ended his 2011 season.

2012
The 2012 season promises to be an exciting challenge for John as he gets to sit astride an Aprilia RSV4 Superbike for the first time with the Spiltlath Redmond Team.

Career statistics

Races by year

British Superbike Championship

References

1982 births
Living people
Motorcycle racers from Northern Ireland
British Superbike Championship riders
FIM Superstock 1000 Cup riders